Lardintown Run is a tributary of Bull Creek and a sub-tributary of the Allegheny River located in both Allegheny and Butler counties in the U.S. state of Pennsylvania.

Course

Lardintown Run joins Bull Creek near the intersection of Bull Creek Road and Lardintown Road in Fawn Township.

See also
 List of rivers of Pennsylvania
 List of tributaries of the Allegheny River

References

External links

U.S. Geological Survey: PA stream gaging stations

Rivers of Pennsylvania
Tributaries of the Allegheny River
Rivers of Allegheny County, Pennsylvania
Rivers of Butler County, Pennsylvania